Bayramly or Bayramlı may refer to:
Bayramlı, Barda, Azerbaijan
Bayramly, Gadabay, Azerbaijan
Bayramly, Imishli, Azerbaijan
Bayramlı, Shamkir, Azerbaijan
Bayramlı, Tovuz, Azerbaijan
Bayramly, Yevlakh, Azerbaijan